Marbla divisa is a moth of the family Erebidae first described by Francis Walker in 1855. It is found in subtropical Africa and is known from the Democratic Republic of the Congo, Nigeria, Madagascar, Gabon, Sierra Leone, Equatorial Guinea and Zambia.

Its wingspan is around 38–40 mm.

References

External links
"Marbla divisa (Walker, 1855)". African Moths. Retrieved April 2, 2020. With images.

Lymantriinae
Moths of Africa
Moths of Madagascar
Moths described in 1855